Francis Lugo (born January 6, 1988, in Maturín, Venezuela) is a Venezuelan beauty pageant titleholder.  She was the official representative of Venezuela to the Miss Continente Americano 2007 pageant held in Guayaquil, Ecuador on June 30, 2007, when she won the title of first runner-up.

Lugo also competed in the 2006 Miss Venezuela pageant, in which she represented the Monagas state.

References

External links
 Miss Earth / Sambil Model Venezuela Official Website
Miss Venezuela Official Website
 Miss Continente Americano Official Website

1988 births
Living people
People from Maturín
Venezuelan beauty pageant winners